Vonyarcvashegy is a town and tourist resort on the north shore of Lake Balaton, in western Hungary. The settlement was created when the former Vonyarc and Vashegy settlements were united in 1850. At that time, the inhabitants dealt primarily with viticulture and fishing. The later cultivated local bathing life was based upon the activity of a bathing association founded in 1930.

External links 

 Official site
 Pictures of Vonyarcvashegy - Pictures of Vonyarcvashegy

References 

Populated places in Zala County